Roy Johnson (October 1, 1895 – January 10, 1986) was an American right-handed pitcher and longtime coach in Major League Baseball. He also was the interim manager of the Chicago Cubs for one game in 1944. He was nicknamed "Hardrock" as a minor league manager because his teams played in a tough, uncompromising way.

Early life and career 
Johnson was born in Madill, Oklahoma. He entered pro baseball in 1915, and, in his only big league season, the war-shortened 1918 campaign, he compiled a 1–5 win–loss mark (.167) and a 3.42 earned run average in ten games and 50 innings pitched for the Philadelphia Athletics. He returned to the minor leagues as a pitcher thereafter and became a manager with Bisbee of the Class D Arizona–Texas League in 1929.

In 1935, Johnson was promoted to a coaching position with the Cubs by manager Charlie Grimm. He was associated with the Cubs for the remainder of his career as a coach (1935–39; 1944–53), minor league pilot, and scout. The Cubs won three National League pennants (and ) during Johnson's 15 total years as a coach.

On May 3, 1944, with the Cubs having lost nine of their first ten National League games, he served as interim manager for one game, between Jimmie Wilson and Grimm's second term; Chicago lost to the Cincinnati Reds, 10–4, their tenth defeat in a row. 

Johnson died at age 90 in Scottsdale, Arizona.

References
J.G. Taylor Spink, ed., The Baseball Register. St. Louis: The Sporting News, 1949.
The Baseball Encyclopedia, Macmillan Books, 10th edition.

External links

1895 births
1986 deaths
Baseball players from Oklahoma
Bisbee Bees players
Chicago Cubs coaches
Chicago Cubs managers
Chicago Cubs scouts
Danville Veterans players
Kansas City Blues (baseball) players
Major League Baseball first base coaches
Major League Baseball pitchers
McAlester Miners players
Minor league baseball managers
Oklahoma City Indians players
People from Madill, Oklahoma
Philadelphia Athletics players
Terrell Terrors players
Tulsa Oilers (baseball) players